Richard Samuel (born 20 January 1952 in Pointe-à-Pitre, Guadeloupe) is  a French civil servant.

He is a graduate of Institut d’études politiques de Paris (IEP Paris).

Career
 1978-1981 (promotion Droits de l’homme) : École nationale d'administration (ÉNA)
 On 2 May 1988: sub-prefect of Clermont, Oise, Picardy
 On 24 March 1993: sub-prefect of Vienne, Isère, Rhône-Alpes 
 On 16 December 1999: sub-prefect of Le Havre, Seine-Maritime, Upper Normandy 
 On 4 August 2003: prefect of Meuse in Bar-le-Duc
 On 25 August 2005: in charge of victims of West Caribbean Airways Flight 708
 On 9 July 2007: prefect of Eure in Évreux
 On 26 November 2009: prefect of Maine-et-Loire in Angers
 On 1 August 2012: prefect of Isère in Grenoble

Honours and awards
: Officer of the  Legion of Honour (2014)
: Commandeur of the Ordre national du Mérite (2011)
: Chevalier (Knight) of the  Ordre du Mérite agricole

References
  "Samuel, Richard, Sébastien, Robert, Michel" (prefect, born in 1952), page 1972 in Who's Who in France : Dictionnaire biographique de personnalités françaises vivant en France et à l’étranger, et de personnalités étrangères résidant en France, 44th edition for 2013 édited in 2012, 2371 p., 31 cm,  .

Notes

External links
 , 2009 video from  channel (1 minute 46 seconds).

See also 

1952 births
Living people
People from Pointe-à-Pitre
Sciences Po alumni
École nationale d'administration alumni
Prefects of France
Prefects of Meuse (department)
Prefects of Eure
Prefects of Maine-et-Loire
Prefects of Isère
Commanders of the Ordre national du Mérite
Officiers of the Légion d'honneur
Knights of the Order of Agricultural Merit
Guadeloupean people